David Lim Tin Kiang  (born 6 January 1938) is a Singaporean former water polo player. He competed in the men's tournament at the 1956 Summer Olympics.

References

External links
 
 

1938 births
Living people
Singaporean male water polo players
Olympic water polo players of Singapore
Water polo players at the 1956 Summer Olympics
Place of birth missing (living people)
20th-century Singaporean people